is a platform game released on the Super Nintendo Entertainment System in 1993 in Japan and 1994 in the west. It was developed by ASCII and published by Titus France in North America and Europe.

Plot

Ardy Lightfoot is an anthropomorphic fox. He is accompanied by his best friend, a blue creature named Pec, who can be used as a weapon, or can take the role of various other helpful devices like a hot air balloon or rock wall destroyer. If Ardy is hit by an enemy, Pec will disappear, and can only be retrieved by finding a chest. If Ardy is without his best friend, he can still attack by bouncing on his tail. He can also protect himself temporarily by hiding behind a clear mirror.

In the story of the game, the sacred rainbow has shattered into seven crystal pieces, and it's up to Ardy to obtain them all. Whoever collects all seven crystal pieces will receive a wish. The evil King Visconti has already gotten one crystal piece, and he is searching for the other pieces. To this end he sends out his followers including Beecroft, Catry and many others. Ardy is assisted by friends along the way, like the unnamed elder, Nina, and a mysterious adventurer named Don Jacoby.

Development and release 
When Titus published Ardy Lightfoot for North American audiences, several changes were introduced. These included numerous sprites, such as Ardy's "waiting" pose, being removed; tied up and crying animals being removed from the background on the forest level; and in level 6, "Eaten!", Catry's gruesome death by acid was written out of the plot; instead of being reduced to a pile of bones, she is merely knocked unconscious.

Reception 

Electronic Gaming Monthly praised the game for its huge levels, numerous character abilities, and impressive bosses, but warned prospective buyers that a great deal of patience is required due to the game's extremely high difficulty. They scored it a 7.2 out of 10. GamePro gave it a positive review as well, citing the varied gameplay and cartoony and colorful graphics. Super Play gave the game an overall score of 83% praising the graphics, animation and sound.

Notes

References

External links 
 Ardy Lightfoot at GameFAQs
 Ardy Lightfoot at Giant Bomb
 Ardy Lightfoot at MobyGames

1993 video games
ASCII Corporation games
Platform games
Side-scrolling video games
Single-player video games
Super Nintendo Entertainment System games
Super Nintendo Entertainment System-only games
Titus Software games
Video games about dogs
Video games developed in Japan